Macha is the name of several rural localities in Russia:
Macha, Penza Oblast, a selo in Machinsky Selsoviet of Tamalinsky District in Penza Oblast
Macha, Sakha Republic, a selo in Machinsky Rural Okrug of Olyokminsky District in the Sakha Republic